Bülent Oran (27 March 1924 – 23 September 2004) was a Turkish screenwriter and actor. He wrote for nearly 250 films between 1952 and 1988. He wrote for the film The Broken Pots, which was entered into the 11th Berlin International Film Festival.

Selected filmography
 The Broken Pots (1960)
 Ankara Ekspresi (1970)

References

External links

1924 births
2004 deaths
Turkish male screenwriters
Turkish male film actors
Film people from Istanbul
20th-century Turkish screenwriters